The Karjala Tournament, also known as Karjala Cup, is an annual ice hockey event held in Finland. The name comes from the sponsoring beer brand Karjala.

History 

The tournament started in 1992 as the Sauna Cup. In 1995, the tournament was played as Christmas Cup at the same time as the Izvestija Trophy tournament, just before the Christmas holiday, causing Russia to send a reserve team to the Christmas Cup.

In 1996, the tournament was moved to early November under the sponsorship of Karjala under the name Karjala Tournament. It became part of the annual Euro Hockey Tour (EHT), in which the national teams of Czech Republic, Finland, Russia and Sweden compete in a series of tournaments. The event has continued to be held every November, with the exception of 2001 when the tournament was pushed back to April 2002.

Results 
Final standings in each event are determined in a round-robin tournament. If teams are tied in points, the standing is determined by the result of the game between the tied teams.

Medal table

References

External links
Euro Hockey Tour news at eurohockey.net
Prize list with link to all teams and results since 1999

 
Euro Hockey Tour
International ice hockey competitions hosted by Finland
Ice hockey tournaments in Europe
International sports competitions in Helsinki
Recurring sporting events established in 1992
1992 establishments in Finland
Autumn events in Finland
Ice hockey events